The Washington Redistricting Commission is a decennial body charged with redrawing congressional and legislative districts in the state of Washington after each census. On November 8, 1983, Washington state passed the 74th amendment to its constitution via Senate Joint Resolution 103 to permanently establish the Redistricting Commission. Earlier that year the first commission redrew the state's congressional map after the previous one drawn by the legislature was ruled unconstitutional. Since after the 1990 census, a committee of four appointees of the majority and minority leaders of the House and Senate appoint a fifth member as non-voting chair, and meet to redistributes representative seats according to census results.

History 
 1956: League of Women Voters proposed Initiative 199 passed, linking redistribution to population trends. However, the resulting redistricting map was altered by the legislature.
 1982: Senate Joint Resolution placed Constitutional Amendment 74 on the ballot.
 1983: Amendment 74 passed; 61% in favor, 39% in opposition.
 1991: The first Redistricting Commission met and created a redistricting plan, including new 9th congressional district.
 2001: The second Redistricting Commission met and created a redistricting plan.
 2011: The third Redistricting Commission met and created a redistricting plan, including new 10th congressional district.
 2021: The fourth Redistricting Commission met, but failed to agree on a redistricting plan by the deadline of November 15, 2021. Under Washington state law, if the commission fails to pass a redistricting plan, then the state Supreme Court is required to do so. After the deadline, the commission published its consensus congressional and state legislative redistricting plans, and encouraged the state Supreme Court to enact them. However, on December 3, the court ruled that the commission had "substantially complied with the statutory deadline" and ordered the commission to complete its work to transmit the consensus redistricting plans to the legislature.

Members

2011 Commission
 Slade Gorton (Senate Republican appointee)
 Tim Ceis (Senate Democratic appointee)
 Tom Huff (House Republican appointee)
 Dean Foster (House Democratic appointee)
 Lura Powell (non-voting chair)

2021 Commission
 Brady Walkinshaw (Senate Democratic appointee)
 Joe Fain (Senate Republican appointee)
 April Sims (House Democratic appointee)
 Paul Graves (House Republican appointee)
 Sarah Augustine (former non-voting chair, resigned on March 7, 2022)

References

External links
Washington State Redistricting Commission

Local government in Washington (state)
Redistricting commissions